"Can't We Try" is a 1987 duet performed by Dan Hill and Vonda Shepard. The ballad was Billboards No. 1 Adult Contemporary Song of the Year for 1987.

"Can't We Try" was released as a single from Dan Hill's 1987 self-titled album. The song reached No. 6 on the Billboard Hot 100 and also on Cash Box, making it Dan Hill's second-biggest hit behind "Sometimes When We Touch", which hit No. 3 back in 1978, and was Vonda Shepard's only Top 10 Pop hit.

It also reached No. 2 for three weeks on the Billboard Adult Contemporary chart (behind "I Wanna Dance with Somebody" by Whitney Houston and "Moonlighting" by Al Jarreau). In Canada, the song reached No. 14.

Track listing
7" single

Chart positions

Year-end charts

Rockell and Collage version

In 1998, Rockell covered the song as a duet with Collage. It was her third single from her 1998 debut album, What Are You Lookin' At? and third single overall. This song reached No. 59 on the Billboard Hot 100 as well as No. 11 on the Hot Dance Music/Maxi-Singles Sales chart.

Track listing

CD single

 Promo CD single

US Remixes CD single

Chart positions

In popular culture
The original Dan Hill version from 1987 was used for the Kelly and Jeffrey characters on the American soap opera Santa Barbara.

References

1987 songs
1987 singles
1998 singles
Dan Hill songs
Rockell songs
Collage (American duo) songs
Columbia Records singles
Male–female vocal duets
Pop ballads
Songs written by Dan Hill